.

Gagillapur is a village in Bejjanki mandal, Karimnagar district, Telangana, India. It is located on the bank of 'Moyedummeda' river. Gagillapur has a population of 1,618 of which males are 813 and females are 805. It is a peaceful village and it has an ashramam called "Shri Dhyananistaashramam". Gagillapur is a developing village nowadays. It has a ZPHS high school Gagillapur, milk centre. It is in between Karimnagar to Siddipet Rajiv rahadari high way. Gagillapur pin code number is 505528.

References

Villages in Karimnagar district